Salahlay,, is a town in the Maroodi Jeex region of  Somaliland and is the seat of the Salahlay District. It is south of Hargeisa, the capital of the country.

Location
The City located around 56 km southeast of Hargeisa and 15 km from the border with the Somali Region of Ethiopia.

Climate
The climate in Salahley is called a desert climate. There is virtually no rainfall during the year. The climate here is classified as BWh by the Köppen-Geiger system. In Salaxley, the average annual temperature is 22.7 °C. About 367 mm of precipitation falls annually.
The driest month is December. There is 1 mm of precipitation in December. In April, the precipitation reaches its peak, with an average of 72 mm.
With an average of 24.7 °C, May is the warmest month. At 19.5 °C on average, January is the coldest month of the year.
The precipitation varies 71 mm between the driest month and the wettest month. The variation in annual temperature is around 5.2 °C

See also
Administrative divisions of Somaliland
Regions of Somaliland
Districts of Somaliland

References

https://en.climate-data.org/africa/somalia/woqooyi-galbeed/salaxley-643964

Populated places in Maroodi Jeex